Rod Hernley is an American para-alpine skier. He represented the United States at the 1984 Winter Paralympics in Innsbruck, Austria in alpine skiing.

He won the bronze medal at the Men's Slalom LW1 event.

References 

Living people
Year of birth missing (living people)
Place of birth missing (living people)
Paralympic alpine skiers of the United States
American male alpine skiers
Alpine skiers at the 1984 Winter Paralympics
Medalists at the 1984 Winter Paralympics
Paralympic bronze medalists for the United States
Paralympic medalists in alpine skiing